José Varela (born 4 November 1984) is a professional road racing cyclist from Costa Rica.

See also
Cycle racing in Costa Rica
Glossary of cycling
History of cycling
Outline of cycling

References

Living people
1984 births
Place of birth missing (living people)
Road racing cyclists
Costa Rican male cyclists